Oxyphenbutazone is a nonsteroidal anti-inflammatory drug (NSAID). It is a metabolite of phenylbutazone.

It was withdrawn from markets worldwide in mid-1980s due to bone marrow suppression and the risk of Stevens–Johnson syndrome.

The word "oxyphenbutazone" is, theoretically, the highest-scoring word under American rules for Scrabble, with a maximum possible score of 1,778 points.

References 

Nonsteroidal anti-inflammatory drugs
Pyrazolidindiones
Phenols
Withdrawn drugs